Pierre Andre Garçon (born August 8, 1986) is a former American football wide receiver. He played college football at Norwich University and Mount Union College, and was drafted by the Indianapolis Colts in the sixth round of the 2008 NFL Draft. He also played five seasons with the Washington Redskins and two seasons with the San Francisco 49ers.

Early life
Garçon is of Haitian descent, and is bilingual, speaking French fluently. Garçon attended John I. Leonard High School in Greenacres, Florida. He earned two varsity letters in football. He also played soccer, playing for travel teams competing across the state and across the country. He was also known for his backflip after scoring goals.

College career
Garçon started his college career at Norwich University in Northfield, Vermont.  As a freshman in 2004, he played in ten games and had 44 receptions for 1,017 yards and 13 touchdowns.  Wanting to play in a more football oriented program, he transferred to Mount Union College in the Ohio Athletic Conference. He averaged over 60 catches, 1,000 yards and 15 touchdowns in his career as a Purple Raider. While at Mount Union he led the team to two consecutive NCAA Division III Football Championships, falling just short of a third. During his sophomore season in 2005, he earned Ohio Athletic Conference second-team honors after having 68 receptions for 1,196 yards and 16 touchdowns.  As a junior, he was named to the Ohio Athletic Conference first-team and was the recipient of the Ed Sherman Award for the OAC's most outstanding receiver.  That season, he was third in the nation with 1,212 receiving yards and had 67 receptions with 17 touchdowns.  As a senior in 2007, Garçon was Ohio Athletic Conference first-team and was the recipient of the Ed Sherman Award, for the second time.  He had 67 receptions for 955 yards and 14 touchdowns.

During his time at Mount Union, he was teammates with future NFL wide receiver, Cecil Shorts III.

Garçon also ran track at Mount Union, where he recorded personal bests of 10.61 seconds in the 100 meters and 21.69 seconds in the 200 meters.

Professional career

Indianapolis Colts
Garçon was drafted by the Indianapolis Colts in the sixth round of the 2008 NFL Draft with the 205th overall pick. In Week 2 against the Minnesota Vikings, he made his NFL debut. Later in Week 10 against the Pittsburgh Steelers, he recorded his first reception. Garçon spent his rookie season as a backup receiver recording only four catches for 23 yards.

By the start of the 2009 season, Garçon was made Reggie Wayne's back-up. After Anthony Gonzalez was injured in the first game of the season, he took his place in the starting lineup. In Week 2 against the Miami Dolphins, he had his first career start and recorded his first touchdown. He continued to be a starter until a hand injury caused him to miss the last two games of the season. He displayed himself as a deep threat in Peyton Manning's offense, recording 47 receptions, 765 yards, and four touchdowns in his second season.

In 2010, Garçon had the starting spot most of the season with the exception for Week 3 and 4, where he was inactive for both games. In Week 6 against the Washington Redskins, he made an impressive one-handed catch. By the end of the season, he had 67 receptions for 784 yards and six touchdowns. Despite Peyton Manning being out the entire 2011 season due to injury, Garçon had his best season with the Colts. He started in all 16 games of the season and recorded 70 receptions, 947 receiving yards, and six touchdowns.

Washington Redskins

2012 season
On March 13, 2012, Garçon signed a five-year $42.5 million, $20.5 million guaranteed, contract with the Washington Redskins.
He was the Redskins' first free agent signing for the 2012 season. During the first OTA of the 2012 preseason, Garçon and Brandyn Thompson accidentally collided into coach Mike Shanahan. In the season opening 40-32 win against the New Orleans Saints, he scored the first touchdown. After catching a 16-yard pass from Robert Griffin III, Garçon ran for an additional 72 yards and a touchdown, which gave Griffin his first career touchdown. Despite not playing for the entire second half of the game due to a foot injury, he finished with 109 yards on four receptions and one touchdown. After missing several games due to the same foot injury, it was confirmed on October 25 that he had a plantar plate tear in the bottom of his right foot. In the Week 12 win against the Dallas Cowboys on Thanksgiving, he would score his second touchdown of the season after catching a 59-yard pass from Griffin III. Garçon finished the season with 44 receptions on 67 targets for 633 yards and four touchdowns.

2013 season

In the Week 9 win against the San Diego Chargers, Garçon achieved a new career-high of 172 receiving yards in a single game. During the Week 16 game against the Dallas Cowboys, he broke the Redskins' all-time franchise record for receptions in a single season, previously held by Art Monk with 106 receptions set in 1984, with 107 receptions. At the end of the 2013 season, Garçon extended the record to 113 receptions, as well as finishing with a new career high of 1,346 yards. His 184 targets ranked No. 1 among NFL wide receivers in 2013. On the NFL Network's Top 100 Players of 2014, Garçon was voted the 80th best player (overall) in the league by his peers.

2014 season

In the Week 7 win against the Tennessee Titans, after catching a short pass from quarterback Colt McCoy, Garçon ran the ball in for a 70-yard  touchdown. Garçon finished the season with 68 receptions on 105 targets for 752 yards and three touchdowns.

2015 season
Garçon opened the 2015 season behind DeSean Jackson with Kirk Cousins as the starting quarterback for the team. After Jackson injured his hamstring in the Week 1 loss against the Miami Dolphins, Garçon moved into the WR1 position and quickly developed a strong trust with Cousins, due to his toughness when being hit along with a knack for finding the ball in traffic. This was evident as Garçon caught the game-winning touchdown in Week 4 against the Philadelphia Eagles, which was caught as he was hit by two defenders. Garçon continued to make tough catches for the team throughout the season, and posted a 60% first-down catch rate in an effort to push the Redskins to the playoffs. In the last three games, Garçon's production increased, catching a touchdown in each of those games, including a 39-yard score in their season finale against the Dallas Cowboys. In the Redskins wild-card postseason matchup against the Green Bay Packers, Garçon posted 5 receptions for 70 yards. He finished the season with 77 receptions on 118 targets for 847 yards and 6 touchdowns (including the postseason).

2016 season

In a game against the Cleveland Browns on October 2, 2016, Garçon caught his 500th career reception. Garçon finished the season with 79 receptions on 116 targets for 1,041 yards and three touchdowns.

San Francisco 49ers

On March 9, 2017, Garçon signed a five-year, $47.5 million contract with the San Francisco 49ers.

On September 10, 2017, in his 49ers debut, Garçon had six receptions for 81 yards in the season opening 23–3 loss to the Carolina Panthers. He started the first eight games of the season recording 40 catches for 500 yards before suffering a neck injury. He was placed on injured reserve on November 4, 2017.

On December 11, 2018, Garçon was placed on injured reserve for the second year in a row after undergoing knee surgery. He finished the season with 24 receptions for 286 yards and one touchdown.

On February 14, 2019, the 49ers declined the option on Garçon's contract, making him a free agent at the start of the new league year.

NFL career statistics

References

External links

Official website
Indianapolis Colts bio
Washington Redskins bio
San Francisco 49ers bio

1986 births
Living people
American sportspeople of Haitian descent
People from Carmel, New York
Sportspeople from the New York metropolitan area
People from Greenacres, Florida
Sportspeople from the Miami metropolitan area
Players of American football from Florida
American football wide receivers
American football return specialists
Norwich Cadets football players
Mount Union Purple Raiders football players
Indianapolis Colts players
Washington Redskins players
San Francisco 49ers players